Astrolabe Island, located at , is an island  long, lying in the Bransfield Strait  northwest of Cape Ducorps, Trinity Peninsula in Antarctica. It was discovered by the French expedition, 1837–40, under Captain Jules Dumont d'Urville, and named by him for his chief expedition ship, the Astrolabe. The island was photographed from the air and triangulated by FIDASE, 1956–57.

Geology

Astrolabe Island is predominantly volcanic rocks, with coarse grained mafic dolerite making up most of the landing site on the east end.  The steep pyramid peaks, called the Dragons Teeth, may be the vents of an old volcanic complex, probably related to the Shetland subduction zone to the north.

See also 
 List of Antarctic and sub-Antarctic islands

Maps
 Trinity Peninsula. Scale 1:250000 topographic map No. 5697. Institut für Angewandte Geodäsie and British Antarctic Survey, 1996.
Antarctic Digital Database (ADD). Scale 1:250000 topographic map of Antarctica. Scientific Committee on Antarctic Research (SCAR). Since 1993, regularly upgraded and updated.

References
 Astrolabe Island. SCAR Composite Antarctic Gazetteer.

Footnotes

 

 
Islands of Trinity Peninsula
Trinity Peninsula
Islands of Graham Land